The following is a sortable table of all songs by Frank Sinatra:

 The column Song lists the song title.
 The column Year lists the year in which the song was recorded.
（Note: Such words as a, an, and the are not recognized as first words of titles）:

References

External links 
Blue Eyes - Frank Sinatra discography

 
Sinatra, Frank
Frank Sinatra